The 1895–1896 season was Manchester City F.C.'s fifth season of league football and fourth season in the Football League.

Football League Second Division

Results summary

Reports

Test matches
As Manchester City finished second in the league, they were entitled to play test matches to compete for promotion to the Football League's First Division. Though they played both teams bottom of the First Division for the 1895–86 season, they lost both matches on aggregate and thus failed in their promotion bid, remaining in the Second Division for the following season.

Squad statistics

Squad
Appearances for competitive matches only

Scorers

All

League

Test matches

Abandoned matches

See also
Manchester City F.C. seasons

References

External links
Extensive Manchester City statistics site

1895-96
English football clubs 1895–96 season